Trương Văn Thái Quý (born 22 August 1997) is a Vietnamese footballer who plays as a midfielder for V-League (Vietnam) club Hà Nội

Honours

Club
Hà Nội
V.League 1: 2018, 2019, 2022
Vietnamese National Cup: 2019, 2020, 2022
Vietnamese Super Cup: 2019, 2020, 2021
Vietnam U23 
Southeast Asian Games: 2019

External links

References 

1997 births
Living people
Vietnamese footballers
People from Quảng Trị province
Association football midfielders
V.League 1 players
Than Quang Ninh FC players
Hanoi FC players
Competitors at the 2019 Southeast Asian Games
Southeast Asian Games medalists in football
Southeast Asian Games gold medalists for Vietnam